Xinhua is a town directly administered by Shennongjia Forestry District, in northwestern Hubei, China, located  southeast of the district seat and  northwest of Yichang. , it has one residential community and nine villages under its administration.

Administrative Divisions
Residential communities:
 Zhangshuping

Villages:
 Longkou, Longtan, Gaobaiyan, Taoping, Maluchang, Daling, Mao'erguan, Shiwotou, Bao'erdong

See also
List of township-level divisions of Hubei

References

Township-level divisions of Hubei
Shennongjia